Richard Rogers (1532/33 – 1597) was an eminent 16th-century priest.

Richard Rogers was educated at Christ's College, Cambridge. In 1559, Rogers was made archdeacon of St Asaph, and on 15 May 1569 he was consecrated Suffragan Bishop of Dover. After his death no more Suffragan Bishops were appointed until 1870.
He was the Dean of Canterbury from 1584 till his death.

Notes

1532 births
1597 deaths
Alumni of Christ's College, Cambridge
16th-century Church of England bishops
Bishops of Dover, Kent
Deans of Canterbury
Archdeacons of St Asaph